George Juan Hatfield (October 29, 1887 – November 15, 1953) served as U.S. Attorney for the Northern District of California from 1925–33 and was the 32nd Lieutenant Governor of California from 1935 to 1939 serving under Governor Frank Merriam. In 1953 there was a state park area created located near Turlock named after him. There was also a bridge named the "George J. Hatfield Bridge" which was located along Route 165 at the San Joaquin River in Merced County.

Family
In 1917, Hatfield married Judith Barlow Hogan. Together they had three children: Janine Snyder, Mary Elizabeth Gracier, and Georgette Judith Kelley.

Education
Hatfield graduated from Stanford University and received his doctor degree of jurisprudence.

Military
Hatfield served in the United States Army in World War I and also in United States Navy.

Career

1922-1950
From 1922 to around 1950, Hatfield was a member of the Republican State Central Committee.

1923-1927
From 1923-1927 he was an active member of the California Veterans Welfare Board.

1925-1933
From 1925-1933 Hatfield was the U.S. Attorney for Northern California.

1943-1953
Hatfield Served in the California State Senate from 1943 until his death in 1953.

Death
Hatfield died on November 15, 1953.

External links

State park
George J. Hatfield at JoinCalifornia.com

References

Lieutenant Governors of California
United States Attorneys for the Northern District of California
1887 births
1953 deaths
20th-century American politicians
Republican Party California state senators
Stanford University alumni
United States Army personnel of World War I